David Gamman Frodin (8 April 1940, Chicago – 12 August 2019, London, UK) was an American botanist, known as a leading expert on the flora of Papua New Guinea.

Biography
His parents, Reuben Sanford Frodin Jr. (1912–2010) and Rebecca Durand Hayward (1911–1990), married in 1937 in Chicago. At the University of Chicago, Reuben S. Frodin Jr. studied law and Rebecca Hayward Durand studied linguistics. At age 11, David G. Frodin moved with his parents and sister from Chicago to Albany, New York, where he attended the Albany Academy for Boys. In 1957, his father received a Fulbright scholarship to teach at Australia's University of New South Wales. At age 17 David Frodin enrolled at the Sydney Boys High School, where he studied for a year and developed an interest in tropical flora. He received in 1963 his bachelor's degree in botany from the University of Chicago. He received two master of science degrees in botany: the first in 1964 from the University of Tennessee and the second in 1965 from the University of Liverpool.

From October 1965 to October 1966, Frodin worked as a scientific officer in Papua New Guinea at the Lae Herbarium under the auspices of the Division of Botany, Office of Forests of the colonial Australian administration. In Papua New Guinea he travelled to the provinces of Sandaun, Madang, Morobe, Southern Highlands, and West New Britain, as well as the Autonomous Region of Bougainville, and collected about 1000 botanical specimens. He was a member of the Tari Subdistrict Expedition in 1966 from June 17th to September 16th with Andrew N. Gillison, Cornelis Kalkman, and Willem Vink. After the expiration of his contract with the Division of Botany, Office of Forests, Frodin visited visited Australian herbaria and made short field trips in Australia and the Far East until June 1967. In 1967, he received a scholarship for doctoral study at the University of Cambridge. There he received in November 1970 his doctorate in botany with dissertation The complex of Cephaloschefflera in Schefflera under the supervision of E. J. H. Corner.

After completing his doctorate, Frodin was from 1971 to 1985 a staff member of the botany department of the University of Papua New Guinea (UPNG), at Boroko.

In 1983 Frodin was appointed an associate professor in botany at UPNG, but he developed a serious medical condition. In 1984 Cambridge University Press published the first edition of his Guide to Standard Floras of the World. In 1985 he returned to the United States as a research associate under Benjamin Clemens Stone in the botany department of the Philadelphia Academy of Natural Science. After a few years Frodin became the botany department's collections manager, but in 1989 Frodin's departmental position was eliminated. From 1989 to 1993 he took various assignments in the United Kingdom, Malaysia, and Papua New Guinea. In 1993 he was appointed a senior scientific officer at the herbarium of the Royal Botanic Gardens, Kew. In 1994 he had a heart attack followed by quadruple bypass surgery, but he recovered and remained highly productive.

In 2000 Frodin was forced to retire at age 60 from his salaried position at Kew, but for the rest of his of life he continued at Kew as an honorary research associate. For the 2001 publication of the 2nd edition of Guide to Standard Floras of the World, he was awarded the 2002 Engler Medal in Silver by the International Association of Plant Taxonomy. From 2005 to 2009 he was employed as a scientific advisor to the Chelsea Physic Garden.

Frodin received the commendation as the most productive taxonomist of the year 2018 at the Kew Science Away Day for the book The genus Schefflera in Sabah, Malaysian Borneo co-authored with Aida Shafreena Ahmed Puad and Todd J. Barkman.

Eponyms
 (Araliaceae) Aralia frodiniana J.Wen\
 (Araliaceae) Schefflera frodiniana Bernardi
 (Euphorbiaceae) Glochidion frodinii Airy Shaw
 (Euphorbiaceae) Phyllanthus frodinii Airy Shaw
 (Lauraceae) Cinnamomum frodinii Kosterm.
 (Melastomataceae) Medinilla frodinii Bodegom
 (Rubiaceae) Psychotria frodinii Sohmer

Selected publications

Articles

Books

References

External links

1940 births
2019 deaths
20th-century American botanists
21st-century American botanists
American taxonomists
Botanists with author abbreviations
University of Chicago alumni
University of Tennessee alumni
Alumni of the University of Liverpool
Alumni of the University of Cambridge
Academic staff of the University of Papua New Guinea
Botanists active in Kew Gardens